The 2018 CrossFit Games was the 12th CrossFit Games and held on August 1–5, 2018, at the Alliant Energy Center in Madison, Wisconsin, United States. The men's competition was won by Mathew Fraser, the women's by Tia-Clair Toomey, and CrossFit Mayhem Freedom won the Affiliate Cup.

A record number of entries was reported for this year's Open, with over 415,000 athletes registering to compete. The Regionals were adjusted this year to reflect the growth of the sport worldwide.  Both Fraser and Toomey dominated the Games, with Fraser extending his record margin of victory to 220 over the runner-up Patrick Vellner.

Qualification
The 2018 CrossFit season was a high point in terms of participation; it recorded the highest number of athletes, at over 415,000, who registered to compete in the Open. Across all age divisions, 429,157 took part in and completed at least one workout. There were six scored event in five weeks (the second workout was split into two scored events – 18.2 and 18.2a). The Open took place from February 22 through March 26.  Mat Fraser and Cassidy Lance-Mcwherter were the respective man and woman winner of the Open. Fraser's points total of 97 was 343 points lower than that of the second place finisher Alex Vigneault, the biggest margin of victory in the Open's history.

The Regionals were adjusted this year to reflect the growth of the sport worldwide; the number of Regionals was increased from eight to nine, and athletes from 18 regions were funnelled into the nine Regionals. Latin America that was previously merged with a US Regional was given its own Regional, while Regionals in the US were reorganized down to five, and Europe was split into two (Europe and Meridian). The number of qualifiers to the Games, however, remained the same: 40 men, 40 women and 40 teams. The Regionals took place over three weekends from May 18 through June 3, 2018. The Regionals were streamed live on CBSSports.com.

Individual

Wednesday, August 1, 2018

Event 1: Crit
Bike 10 laps for time, approximately 1200 meters per lap.

Athletes competed in a criterium race on bicycles with all competing athletes on the track simultaneously. Patrick Vellner crashed in the event, and finished in 35th place. The event was won by Adrian Mundwiler the men's heat and Kristin Holte for the women's heat.

Event 2: 30 Muscle-ups
The athletes performed 30 muscle-ups on gymnastic rings as fast as possible. The event was won by Logan Collins and Kristi Eramo.

Event 3: CrossFit Total
One lift of a maximum weight for a back squat
One lift of a maximum weight for a shoulder press
One lift of a maximum weight for a deadlift
Athletes had four minutes to make three attempts at each lift for the heaviest weight. The winning score was the cumulative total of the three heaviest weights in each lift. Sara Sigmundsdottir fractured her rib during the warm-up for this event, but continued competing for this and the following events, eventually had to withdraw from the competition before event 10. The event was won by Royce Dunne (100kg shoulder press, and 213kg back squat, and 256kg deadlift) for the men and by Tia-Clair Toomey (150kg back squat, and 58kg shoulder press, and 188kg deadlift) for the women.

Event 4: Marathon Row
The competitors used a Concept-2 rowing machine to accumulate 42,195 meters, the distance of a marathon, as fast as possible. The event was won by Lukas Esslinger with a time of 2 hours, 43 minutes, 50 seconds and Margaux Alvarez at 3 hours, 0 minutes, 42 seconds.

Friday, August 3, 2018

Event 5: The Battleground
For time while wearing a weighted vest:
Rescue Randy drag
Two rope climbs
Obstacle course run
Two rope climbs
Rescue Randy drag

Competitors started by dragging "Rescue Randy", a weighted rescue training mannequin, across the stadium. After the drag, they climbed two  ropes, each with a different diameter. They then ran a course with eight obstacles consisting of cargo net climbs, wall climbs, monkey bars, rope swings, and log balances. The competitors then returned to the rope climbs and dummy drag. 

At the event, both Mat Fraser and Patrick Vellner fell off the cargo net, with Vellner bruising his lungs and required medical attention after the race. The event was won by Cole Sager and Laura Horváth.

Event 6: Clean and Jerk Speed Ladder
The event consists of three rounds of five progressively heavier clean and jerks. The top 20 athletes to finish the five lifts in quarterfinal round with a one-minute time cap move on to the semifinal round. With a two-minute cap and five heavier barbells, the top five competitors move on to the final round. The final round has the five athletes progress through five heavier weights as fast as possible, or as heaviest weight they can lift in the three-minute time cap. The event was won by Nicholas Urankar and Amanda Barnhart.

Event 7: Fibonacci
5 parallette handstand push-ups
5 deadlifts with two kettlebells
8 parallette handstand push-ups
8 kettlebell deadlifts
13 parallette handstand push-ups
13 kettlebell deadlifts
89-foot overhead lunge with two kettlebells

A repeat of the final event of the previous year, with only a change to women's event to make it match the number of movements as the men. The previous year, Logan Collins was the only man to finish the event (with a time of 5:29:09), while 27 women finished with the lower quantity of handstand push-ups. The men use  kettlebells for the deadlifts and  kettlebells for the lunges. The women use  kettlebells for the deadlifts and  kettlebells for the lunges. All must be done with a six-minute time cap.

The event was won by Mat Fraser, who had taken second in the event the previous year, and Katrín Davíðsdóttir. Four men finished the 2018 event, including previous finisher Logan Collins, and 23 women finished the updated version of the event.

Saturday, August 4, 2018

Event 8: Madison Triplus
Swim 500 meters
Paddle on a paddleboard for 1000 meters
Run 2000 meters

The event was won by Dean Linder-Leighton and Tia-Clair Toomey.

Event 9: Chaos
35/30 calories on a SkiErg
30/25 burpees with a set height target at the top
45/40 single-arm dumbbell overhead squats
40/45 alternating single-leg squats
25 box jump-overs
 tumbler pull

This event was designed so that the athletes did not know the quantity or movement going into each station. On the SkiErg, burpees, and squats, the athletes were told to move to the next station only when they reached the specified quantity. They were told the quantity of box jumps once they reached the box. The men, who went second on the event, were sequestered so that they could not find out the movements.

The quantities varied between the men's and women's event. The men had 35 calories on the SkiErg, a machine built by Concept2 similar to their rowing machines but meant to simulate a cross-country skiing motion, and the women had 30. The burpees had 30 repetitions for the men and 25 for the women, as well as a higher target for the men. On the single-leg squats, the men had 40 while the women had 45.

The event was won by Patrick Vellner and Katrín Davíðsdóttir.

Events 10 and 11: Bicouplet 1 and 2
Bicouplet 2
12 snatches
12 bar muscle-ups
9 snatches
9 bar muscle-ups
6 snatches
6 bar muscle-ups
—Rest—
Bicouplet 1
21 snatches
21 chest-to-bar pull-ups
15 snatches
15 chest-to-bar pull-ups
9 snatches
9 chest-to-bar pull-ups

Each heat performed events 10 and 11 back-to-back with a short rest in between. The order of the two events was voted on by fans to decide if Bicouplet 1 or 2 would be performed first with Bicouplet 2 becoming chosen as event 10.

Event 10, Bicouplet 2, was won by Willy Georges and Camille Leblanc-Bazinet . Event 11, Bicouplet 1, was won by Rasmus Andersen and Kara Saunders.

Sunday, August 5, 2018

Event 12: Two-Stroke Pull
Five rounds of:
300-meter run
Assault Bike for calories, 20 for men and 15 for women

The event was won by Lukas Högberg and Laura Horváth.

Event 13: Handstand Walk
As fast as possible, each competitor performed 50 double-unders with a heavy jump rope and then navigated an obstacle course while walking on their hands. The obstacles consisted of a pylon slalom, up and down a ramp, up and down stairs, and finished with a handstand walk across a set of parallel bars. Each individual obstacle had to be done without falling.

The event was won by Cody Anderson and Brooke Wells.

Event 14: Aeneas
Peg board ascents, five for the men and four for the women
A yoke carry, adding weight every 

The event was a "chipper," a workout involving multiple exercises done sequentially without returning (as in "chipping away" at the number of repetitions) for the fastest time or as far as possible in the eight-minute time cap. The athletes started with climbing the peg board before moving on the thrusters, a CrossFit movement that is a combination of a front squat and push press in one continuous motion.

Having already secured first place overall in the 2018 Games, Mathew Fraser also finished first for this event. The women's event was won by Laura Horváth, who finished the 2018 Games as the second-place finisher overall, 64 points behind the Games winner Tia-Clair Toomey. Toomey finished second in the event. Laura Horvath was named Rookie of the Year.

Team events
Bike Deadlift
The 30s
Team Battleground
1RM Snatch
Synchro Worm
Team Triplus
Handstand Bob
Bob Sprint
Bicouplet Relay
Running Bob
Lunging Worm

Podium finishers

Individuals and teams

Masters men

Masters women

Teens

References

External links
 2018 CrossFit Games Individual events on CrossFit official YouTube channel
 2018 CrossFit Games

International sports competitions hosted by the United States
CrossFit Games
CrossFit